is a Japanese distilled beverage. It is typically distilled from  rice, barley, sweet potatoes, buckwheat, or brown sugar, though it is sometimes produced from other ingredients such as chestnut, sesame seeds, potatoes, or even carrots.

Typically shōchū contains 25% alcohol by volume, which is weaker than baijiu, whiskey or vodka but stronger than huangjiu, sake or wine. It is not uncommon for multiply distilled shōchū, which is more likely to be used in mixed drinks, to contain up to 35% alcohol by volume.

Etymology
The word  is the Japanese rendition of the Chinese shaojiu, meaning "burned liquor", which refers to the heating process during distillation. The Chinese way of writing shaojiu with the character 酒 is considered archaic and obsolete in modern Japanese, which uses the character 酎. Nevertheless, both characters mean "liquor".

Culture

Drinking

Shōchū should not be confused with sake, a brewed rice wine. Its taste is usually far less fruity and depends strongly on the nature of the starch used in the distilling process. Its flavor is often described as "nutty" or "earthy". 

Shōchū is drunk in many ways according to season or personal taste:

 neat, i.e., on its own with nothing added
 on the rocks, i.e., mixed with ice, known as "rokku" in Japanese
 diluted with room temperature water (水割り mizuwari) or hot water (お湯割り oyuwari),
 mixed with oolong tea or fruit juice
 as chūhai (shōchū highball), a mixed drink consisting of shōchū, soda water, ice and some flavoring, often lemon, grapefruit, apple or ume (East Asian plum)
 mixed very cold with a beer-flavored mixer known as Hoppy

Shōchū is widely available in supermarkets, liquor stores, and convenience stores in Japan while canned chuhai drinks are sold in some of Japan's ubiquitous vending machines. However, it is more difficult to find shōchū outside Japan except in urban areas with large enough Japanese populations. Interest in shōchū has begun to grow in North America, particularly in cosmopolitan cities such as Los Angeles, San Francisco, Vancouver, Toronto, and New York. Dedicated shōchū bars have begun to appear in New York and more than 100 brands are now available in the U.S. market.

In Kyūshū, the center of production, shōchū is far more common than sake. Indeed, there "sake" (酒) generally refers to shōchū, and is sometimes consumed mixed with hot water (Oyuwari), especially in cooler months.  First hot water is poured into the glass, then shōchū is gently added. The liquids mix naturally and stirring is unnecessary. Typically, when serving a standard 25% ABV shōchū oyuwari, the amount of shōchū exceeds the amount of hot water and is enjoyed for its aroma. Occasionally, shōchū and water are mixed, left to stand for a day, and then gently heated. This traditional pre-dilution technique is known as maewari in Japan.

Boom
The early 21st century witnessed a consumer boom in shōchū within Japan, and in 2003 domestic shipments surpassed those of sake for the first time.
Shōchū bars appeared serving shōchū exclusively, and premium brands with a focus on particular ingredients, production methods, or aging techniques entered the market. The beverage has undergone a change of image; formerly it was seen as an old fashioned drink, but now has become trendy amongst young drinkers, particularly women.  The boom also had negative effects: It caused a serious shortage of sweet potatoes, a basic ingredient of some popular types of shōchū and, with the emergence of expensive premium brands, pricing scams appeared.

In 2005 the Japanese television drama Kiken na Aneki illustrated this change in drinking habits. Its plot centered on the Minagawa family of Miyazaki Prefecture, who were brewers of a sweet potato shōchū called imojōchū. The lead character Hiroko (Ito Misaki) spends the majority of the series trying to come up with enough money to save the distillery from loan sharks, but in the process becomes involved with corporate distilleries. The larger companies formulate an advertising campaign that results in the imojōchū becoming a popular drink.  In this fictional account, the beverage is marketed to young women when it previously had been mostly consumed by the older male generation.

There are several reasons for shōchū's recent popularity. With increasing health-consciousness, many people see it as healthier than some alternatives. There have been well-publicized claims of medical benefits, including that it can be effective in preventing thrombosis, heart attacks, and diabetes. It is also a versatile drink that is suited to most styles of cuisine.

Shigechiyo Izumi, a Japanese citizen who apparently lived to be 105, made shōchū part of his daily dietary regimen. This practice was mentioned along with his record in the Guinness Book of World Records. Because of his intimate passion for shōchū, many have speculated that shōchū is healthy and can actually promote longevity. This even prompted some local Ryūkyū shōchū brewers to market a special Longevity Liquor (長寿の酒) shōchū bearing his name on the front label. Despite these claims, Izumi's personal physician strongly advised against drinking shōchū, as his kidneys were not strong enough to process shōchū in his advanced age. But Izumi went on to say: "Without shōchū there would be no pleasure in life. I would rather die than give up drinking."

History

Shōchū production has been historically attested to since the 16th century. When the missionary Francis Xavier visited Kagoshima Prefecture in 1549, he recorded that "the Japanese drink arak made from rice [...] but I have not seen a single drunkard. That is because once inebriated they immediately lie down and go to sleep."

The oldest existing direct reference to shōchū in Japan can be found at Kōriyama Hachiman shrine in Ōkuchi, Kagoshima. There, two carpenters working on the shrine in 1559 inscribed the following graffiti on a wooden plank in the roof: "The high priest was so stingy he never once gave us shōchū to drink. What a nuisance!"

From these early times through to the Edo period shōchū was produced throughout Japan in the traditional kasutori way, using single pot distillation. During the Meiji period, the column still was introduce to Japan from Great Britain, making affordable mass production of high-purity multiply distilled shōchū possible during a time of chronic rice shortages. Shōchū made the traditional way was called "old-style shōchū" and that produced using the new multiple-distillation machinery "new-style shōchū."

In the early 20th century, Hajime Katahira (1884-1936), Minosuke Kurose (1882-1967), and Tsunekichi Kurose (1885-1925) in Kasasa Village in Kagoshima Prefecture established the Kurose Toji Guild. Through their experience in both Okinawan Awamori and sake production, these men revolutionized traditional shochu production through the introduction of black koji (A. awamori) and multi-stage fermentation. Prior to this multistage fermentation process, shochu was made in the donburi style with both koji inoculated grains and the main ingredients added to a single fermentation. Today, almost all authentic shochu is made with a multi-stage fermentation. At its peak, the Kurose Koji Guild boasted more than 500 members who would travel throughout Japan to produce shochu from local agricultural ingredients. 

Tamaki Inui (1873–1946), a lecturer at University of Tokyo, succeeded in the first isolating and culturing aspergillus such as A. kawachii, A. awamori and a variety of subtaxa of A. oryzae. His contemporary, Genichirō Kawachi (1883–1948), who is said to be the father of modern shōchu with his development of the Kawachi Drum koji machine as well as the isolation of white koji, also known as A. kawachii, which is named after him. These discoveries results in great progress in producing high quality shochu in Japan, but the Kawachi Drum machine and other innovations led to the eventual demise of the Kurose Toji Guild, which today has just a handful of active members, but primarily continues to live on in a museum in Kasasa Village. Aspergillus developed by Kawachi has also been used for soju and makgeolli in Korea.

Definition and classification
Japan's alcohol taxation law, as revised in April 2006, defines two categories of shōchū
(also called white liquor).

Multiply distilled shōchū
Alcohol distilled more than once with special machinery for that purpose, diluted for sale to an alcohol by volume level of less than 36%, that meets the following conditions:

 Fruit or grain that has been allowed to germinate is not used as a base ingredient in whole or in part (preventing brandy and malt whisky from being considered shōchū).
 It is not filtered through charcoal.
 If sugar is used as a base ingredient, in whole or in part, then the result of distillation must be at least 95% alcohol by volume (see discussion under brown sugar shōchū).
 It is not fortified at distillation time with other than expressly permitted ingredients (eliminates liqueurs).

Kōrui (Class A) in the classification of shōchū simply means classification and does not mean that the quality is superior to that of Otsurui (Class B).

It is generally distilled from a fermented liquid similar to molasses. Repeated distillation forms ethyl alcohol of high purity which is typically odorless and has a taste of little distinction. Water is then added, and the precise nature of this water has subtle effects on the taste and palatability of the shōchū.

Kōrui shōchū is made from sweet potato, potato, and corn.
It is generally produced in modern large factories. Distillers make Kōrui shōchū by weakening the distilled alcohol.

The specialized distillation equipment, called a patent still lends it to mass production at low cost, so large corporations produce this kind of shōchū in high volume. In Japan, it retails in plastic bottles, cans, and paper cup form and is consumed as a cheap alcoholic drink. It forms the base of several cocktails and liqueurs such as chūhai and umeshu.

Singly distilled shōchū
Alcohol distilled using other than multiple-distillation machinery, with alcohol by volume of no more than 45%, from one of the following:

 ferment whose primary ingredient is grain or potato and their kōji
 ferment whose primary ingredient is grain kōji
 ferment whose primary ingredient is sake lees, possibly with rice and/or its kōji (see kasutori shōchū)
 ferment whose primary ingredient is sugar (restricted types) and rice kōji (see brown sugar shōchū)
 ferment whose primary ingredient is grain or potato and their kōji along with other ingredients, provided the other ingredients form no more than 50% by weight
 other substances with certain restrictions

Otsurui (Class B) in the classification of shōchū simply means classification and does not mean that the quality is inferior to that of Kōrui (Class A).

The equipment used for single distillation is called a pot still. As the shōchū is distilled just once it retains the character of the base ingredient, typically rice, barley, or sweet potato, with a strong taste and aroma. Small-to-medium size enterprises make most brands, with the island of Kyūshū famous as the center of production. Recently however larger corporations have been entering the market.

Maturation
Shōchū is shipped after maturation. Maturation techniques vary in storage vessel and location, both of which affect the character of the shōchū. The most commonly used containers for aging shōchū are stainless steel tanks, clay pots, and wooden barrels or casks.

As a result of maturation, the flavor, and aroma of shōchū settle. Maturation generally takes between one and three months. Maturation from three to six months is called beginning maturation. During this period, sharp flavors in the shōchū generally decrease. Shōchū matured from six months to three years usually has a mellow taste.

A shōchū called long-term maturation is matured for more than three years. But long-term maturation does not always improve the flavor. On the other hand, long-term maturation is particularly effective for awamori. Distillers sometimes mature awamori for longer than ten years.

Locations
Shōchū is matured in various places to impart unique flavors, typically where there are minimal variations in temperature and humidity.
These places include tunnels and limestone caverns.

Honkaku shōchū
Until 2006 Japanese postwar tax law classified shōchū into "kōrui" and "otsurui" types.

Fearing a tendency to believe that otsurui shōchū is somehow inferior to kōrui shōchū, the Kyūshū Otsurui Shochu Producers' Association lobbied the Finance Ministry, and in 1962 succeeded in having , or authentic shōchū, recognized as an alternative name. The name is believed to have been coined in 1957 by Junkichi Enatsu, the president of Kirishima Brewery of Miyakonojō, Miyazaki Prefecture.

However, since the term was not formally defined naming disputes arose. As a result, on 1 November 2002, the law was clarified and shōchū satisfying any of conditions 1 to 5 of the above definition of singly distilled shōchū can be called honkaku shōchū. Those satisfying the final condition are excluded.

Shōchū consumption in Japan by categories
2016 Shōchū consumption in Japan by categories (tax base) is as follows;

Moromitori shōchū
Most singly distilled shōchū is moromitori shōchū (もろみ取焼酎). This name derives from its production process:

 Raw material treatment. Usually, rice or barley is steeped in water, then steamed to promote starch gelatinization and cooled.
 Kōji production. kōjikin, or koji mold spores, are cultivated onto the material to form koji mold which creates enzymes as it grows. The enzymes break starch molecules down into sugar molecules that can be fermented, a process called saccharification.
 Primary fermentation. The koji is mashed by adding both water and yeast and is fermented for seven to nine days in a tank or vat to form unrefined alcohol, called moto or (first stage) moromi.
 Secondary fermentation. The steamed main ingredient and water are added to the unrefined alcohol and fermented again to form (second stage) moromi. The ingredient added during this second stage determines the variety of shōchū; for example, if sweet potato is added then it becomes sweet potato shōchū.
 Distillation. Purification of the unrefined moromi alcohol.

Kōji

 mold, a kind of Aspergillus fungus, has a profound effect on the final taste of the shōchū. There are three varieties of kōji mold with distinct characteristics.
 Yellow kōji (A. oryzae etc). Used to produce sake, and at one time all honkaku shōchū. However yellow kōji is extremely sensitive to temperature; its moromi can easily sour during fermentation. This makes it difficult to use in warmer regions such as Kyūshū, and gradually black and white kōji became more common.  Its strength is that it gives rise to a rich, fruity refreshing taste, so despite the difficulties and great skill required it is still used by some manufacturers. It is popular amongst young people and women who previously had no interest in typically strong sweet potato shōchū, playing a role in its recent revival.  Thus, white and black kōji are mainly used in the production of shōchū, but only yellow kōji (A. oryzae) is usually used in the production of sake.
 White kōji (A. kawachii etc). Discovered as a mutation from black kōji by Genichirō Kawachi in 1923. This effect was researched and white kōji was successfully grown independently. White kōji is easy to cultivate and its enzymes promote rapid saccharization; as a result, it is used to produce most shōchū today. It gives rise to a drink with a refreshing, gentle, sweet taste.
 Black kōji (A. awamori also known as A. luchuensis etc) . Mainly used to produce shōchū and awamori. In 1901, Tamaki Inui of the University of Tokyo succeeded in the first isolating and culturing. In 1910, Genichirō Kawachi succeeded for the first time in culturing var. kawachi, a variety of subtaxa of A. awamori. This improved the efficiency of shochu production. It produces plenty of citric acid, which helps to prevent the souring of the moromi. Of all three kōji it most effectively extracts the taste and character of the base ingredients, giving its shōchū a rich aroma with a slightly sweet, mellow taste. Its spores disperse easily, covering production facilities and workers' clothes in a layer of black. Such issues led to it falling out of favor, but due to the development of New Kuro-kōji (NK-kōji) in the mid-1980s, interest in black kōji resurged amongst honkaku shōchū makers because of the depth and quality of the taste it produced.  Several popular brands now explicitly state they use black kōji on their labels.

Water
Water is one of the most important ingredients for making shōchū. The quality of water affects that of shōchū directly. Various kinds of water are used in the process of making shōchū.

Varieties
There is a broad variety of moromitori shōchū.  Four locations have achieved protection as geographical indications under World Trade Organization TRIPS article 23 and are noted below.

Rice shōchū
 shares its base ingredient with sake. It has a fairly thick taste, and appears to have originally developed in regions too warm for sake production.

Kumamoto Prefecture is particularly well known for its production of rice shōchū. Notably  produced in Hitoyoshi-bonchi is protected as a geographical indication.

Rice shōchū is also produced in regions famous for their sake, such as Niigata and Akita prefectures.

Barley shōchū
 is generally less distinctive than rice shōchū and easy to drink. However, if cask-aged the taste can be quite sharp and strongly reminiscent of single-malt whisky.

Ōita Prefecture, Miyazaki Prefecture, and Iki in Nagasaki Prefecture are strong production hubs.  has also been given protection as a geographical indication.

Sweet potato shōchū

 uses sweet potato, widely cultivated across southern Kyūshū since the Edo period, as its base ingredient. Originally it was almost exclusively produced in Kagoshima and Miyazaki prefectures, but nowadays is made across Japan using locally grown sweet potatoes.

It tends to have a strong taste and a distinctive smell; more recently producers have made varieties whose aroma is somewhat suppressed.

Kagoshima's  has been given protection under WTO rules as a geographical indication.

The 1956 film The Teahouse of the August Moon portrayed an American-occupied Okinawan village rebuilding its economy with sweet potato shōchū.

The taste of sweet potato shōchū is a bit smoky, evocative of some whiskeys.

Brown sugar shōchū

From the Edo period through to the time of the Pacific War, the Amami Islands produced drinks such as awamori and a distilled alcohol based on brown sugar. From the middle of the war through to the American occupation, because of a shortage of rice (the base ingredient of awamori) and an inability to export the sugar-based alcohol to the mainland, a large surplus was produced. In 1953, when the Amami Islands were returned to Japanese sovereignty, the alcohol was not classified as "shōchū" under the 1949 alcohol tax law and therefore would attract a high rate of tax. This recognition was geographically restricted to the Amami Islands of Kagoshima Prefecture and was conditional on the use of rice kōji. This regional restriction remains in place to this day; as can be seen in the legal definition of singly distilled shōchū above.

Typically, brown sugar shōchū contains 30% or 25% alcohol by volume. Contrary to what might be expected, brown sugar shōchū has a mild and not particularly sweet taste, as it contains no sugar. Nowadays it is produced in 25 breweries in 5 islands: Kikaijima, Amami Ōshima, Tokunoshima, Okinoerabujima and Yoronjima. Awamori, however, is no longer made outside Okinawa Prefecture.

Before the war, another alcoholic drink based on brown sugar was made in the Ogasawara Islands. Its name translates as "sugar alcohol" and could be seen as a form of brown sugar shōchū. Production ceased because of the war, but recently, aiming to revive its popularity, similar alcohol, using no rice kōji, has been introduced. However, as Ogasawara does not qualify for the above special regional exemption, this alcohol is instead classified as rum or spirits.

Soba shōchū
Soba, or buckwheat,  has origins going back to just 1973 when Unkai Brewery Co., of Gokase, Miyazaki Prefecture, developed it using soba from the local mountainous region as its base ingredient. Since then shōchū producers across Japan have produced it, sometimes as part of a shōchū blend.

The taste is milder than barley shōchū.

Awamori

Prior to April 1983, it was labeled otsurui shōchū, but is now properly called "Authentic Awamori".

Awamori is made from Thai long-grained indica crushed rice, not the usual short-grained japonica of standard shōchū. The fermentation process employs black koji mold indigenous to Okinawa rather than the standard white variety, and secondary fermentation is not performed.
Fermentation is done in a way that creates plenty of citric acid, allowing it to be produced all year round despite Okinawa's hot climate. After distillation its strength is reduced with water to about 25% alcohol by volume, although some varieties go as high as 65%.

Japanese law classifies awamori as a singly distilled honkaku shōchū despite the different production processes.

With its method of production, awamori could theoretically be made anywhere in Japan, but Ryūkyū Awamori (琉球泡盛) is a protected geographical indication restricted to Okinawa.

Others
Japanese law admits a very wide range of unusual base ingredients, such as perilla leaf, sesame and chestnut, and shōchū made from most if not all of these exists. For example, there is a milk shōchū brand called Makiba-no Yume. Others are generic shōchū mixed with a particular fruit juice or extracts.

With its peculiarity, such shōchū is typically intended to catch the eye of visitors to a region and has attracted limited broader appeal. Soba shōchū is a good example of one that has managed to achieve more widespread success.

Kasutori shōchū
In contrast to moromitori shōchū,  is made by distilling the sake lees leftover from the fermentation of sake. It is a form of honkaku shōchū.

It first became popular in the north of Kyūshū, and then spread to other areas, being manufactured during a period when it was not possible to brew refined sake across Japan. It is also widely used in sake production to stop fermentation before it is complete, which can help prevent degradation or give a dry taste. Shōchū made for this purpose is called .

During the Edo period shōchū lees were used as a fertilizer during the rice-planting season. Many farms, therefore, installed distillation equipment to distill sake lees to produce shōchū lees. Whilst the lees were used in the fields, the distilled alcohol was drunk, or offered to the gods, at the  festival held at the end of the rice-planting season to pray for a bountiful harvest. Kasutori shōchū has therefore also come to be known as sanaburi shōchū.

Owing to the recent surge in popularity of shōchū in Japan, an increasing number of manufacturers have been making kasutori shōchū.

Most kasutori shōchū is made in modern ways, shōchū made via older production processes has decreased sharply. People who wish to preserve Japanese culture call shōchū produced the historical way , such drinks have been revitalized by their activities.

Slang usage
Confusingly kasutori is also a slang term for a separate, inferior form of shōchū. After the Pacific War, in a chaotic society with a shortage of good alcohol, moonshine shōchū began to circulate. Its source and ingredients were not apparent, and in extreme cases contained toxic methyl alcohol diluted with water. Such shōchū with ill side-effects became known as kasutori, and the association with poor shōchū lingered, sometimes even affecting the image of "real" respectable kasutori shōchū.

The expressions kasutori literature and kasutori culture also came to be associated with the upheavals of the postwar period.

Blended shōchū
Singly distilled and multiply distilled shōchū can be mixed to form . Formerly it was often mislabeled honkaku shōchū, or had no indication of mixing or relative volumes. Starting in 2005 the industry regulated itself and created the blended shōchū mark, with subcategorization based upon the relative volumes used.

Singly distilled shōchū makes up 50%–95% of the total volume of singly distilled blended shōchū. This category is targeted at those viewing pure singly distilled shōchū as having too strong a smell or taste, aiming to be softer and more easily drinkable.

In multiply distilled blended shōchū singly distilled shōchū makes up 5%–50% of the total volume. With a focus on price, this tries to combine the cheap mass-production benefits of multiply distilled shōchū whilst introducing some of the distinctive flavor and aroma of the singly distilled form.

See also

Awamori—Distilled Okinawan alcoholic drink
Baijiu—Distilled Chinese alcoholic drink
Soju—Distilled Korean alcoholic drink

References

External links
 Shochu Pro
 Honkaku Shochu and Awamori
 本格焼酎の楽しみ 
 九州焼酎探検隊 

Japanese distilled drinks
Japanese alcoholic drinks
Distilled drinks
Alcoholic drinks